This is a list of 194 species in Limnephilus, a genus of northern caddisflies in the family Limnephilidae.

Limnephilus species

 Limnephilus abbreviatus Banks, 1908 i c g
 Limnephilus abstrusus McLachlan, 1872 i c g
 Limnephilus acnestus Ross, 1938 i c g
 Limnephilus acrophylax Schmid, 1952 i c g
 Limnephilus acula Ross & Merkley, 1952 i c g
 Limnephilus adapus Ross, 1950 i c g
 Limnephilus ademiensis Martynov, 1914 i c g
 Limnephilus ademus Ross, 1941 i c g b
 Limnephilus affinis Curtis, 1834 i c g
 Limnephilus aistleitneri Malicky, 1986 i c g
 Limnephilus alagnaki Ruiter, 1995 i c g
 Limnephilus alaicus (Martynov, 1915) i c g
 Limnephilus alberta Denning, 1958 i c g
 Limnephilus alconura Ross & Merkley, 1952 i c g
 Limnephilus algosus (McLachlan, 1868) i c g
 Limnephilus alienus Martynov, 1915 i c g
 Limnephilus anadyrensis Martynov, 1936 i c g
 Limnephilus apache Flint, 1965 i c g
 Limnephilus aretto Ross, 1938 i c g
 Limnephilus argenteornatus Hagen, 1873 i c g
 Limnephilus argenteus Banks, 1914 i c g
 Limnephilus arizona Ross, 1941 i c g
 Limnephilus asaphes McLachlan, 1880 i c g
 Limnephilus asiaticus (McLachlan, 1874) i c g
 Limnephilus assimilis (Banks, 1908) i c g
 Limnephilus atercus Denning, 1965 i c g
 Limnephilus atlanticus Nybom, 1948 i c g
 Limnephilus audeus Botosaneanu, 2000 g
 Limnephilus auricula Curtis, 1834 i c g
 Limnephilus baja Ruiter, 1995 i c g
 Limnephilus bifidus Banks, 1908 i c g
 Limnephilus binotatus Curtis, 1834 g
 Limnephilus biparta Denning in Denning & Sykora, 1966 i c g
 Limnephilus bipunctatus Curtis, 1834 i c g
 Limnephilus bloomfieldi Ruiter, 1995 i c g
 Limnephilus borealis (Zetterstedt, 1840) i c g
 Limnephilus bucketti Denning, 1965 i c g
 Limnephilus bulgani Mey, 1991 i c g
 Limnephilus canadensis Banks, 1908 i c g
 Limnephilus castor Ross & Merkley, 1952 i c g
 Limnephilus catula Denning, 1965 i c g
 Limnephilus caucasicus Schmid, 1955 i c g
 Limnephilus centralis Curtis, 1834 i c g
 Limnephilus challisa Denning, 1958 i c g
 Limnephilus chereshnevi Nimmo, 1995 i c g
 Limnephilus cianficconiae Malicky, 1980 i c g
 Limnephilus cinctus Hagen, 1865 g
 Limnephilus cockerelli Banks, 1900 i c g
 Limnephilus coenosus Curtis, 1834 i c g
 Limnephilus coloradensis (Banks, 1899) i c g
 Limnephilus concolor Banks, 1899 i c g b
 Limnephilus correptus McLachlan, 1880 i c g
 Limnephilus ctenifer Flint, 1967 i c g
 Limnephilus decipiens (Kolenati, 1848) i c g
 Limnephilus diphyes McLachlan, 1880 i c g
 Limnephilus discolor (Banks, 1901) i c g
 Limnephilus dispar McLachlan, 1875 i c g
 Limnephilus distinctus Tian & Yang in Tian, Li, Yang & Sun, in Chen, editor, 1993 i c g
 Limnephilus diversus (Banks, 1903) i c g
 Limnephilus doderoi (Navas, 1929) i c g
 Limnephilus ectus Ross, 1941 i c g
 Limnephilus elegans Curtis, 1834 i c g
 Limnephilus eocenicus Cockerell, 1920 i c g
 Limnephilus externus Hagen, 1861 i c g b
 Limnephilus extractus Walker, 1852 i c g
 Limnephilus extricatus McLachlan, 1865 i c g
 Limnephilus fagus Ross, 1941 i c g b
 Limnephilus femoralis Kirby in Richardson, 1837 i c g
 Limnephilus femoratus (Zetterstedt, 1840) i c g
 Limnephilus fenestratus (Zetterstedt, 1840) i c g
 Limnephilus fischeri Ruiter, 1995 i c g
 Limnephilus flavastellus Banks, 1918 i c g b
 Limnephilus flavicornis (Fabricius, 1787) i c g
 Limnephilus flavospinosus (Stein, 1874) i c g
 Limnephilus frijole Ross, 1944 i c g
 Limnephilus fumigatus (Germar, 1827) i c g
 Limnephilus fumosus (Banks, 1900) i c g
 Limnephilus fuscicornis (Rambur, 1842) i c g
 Limnephilus fuscinervis (Zetterstedt, 1840) i c g
 Limnephilus fuscoradiatus Schmid & Guppy, 1952 i c g
 Limnephilus fuscovittatus Matsumura, 1904 i c g
 Limnephilus germanus McLachlan, 1875 i c g
 Limnephilus graecus Schmid, 1965 i c g
 Limnephilus granti Nimmo, 1991 i c g
 Limnephilus griseus (Linnaeus, 1758) i c g
 Limnephilus guadarramicus Schmid, 1955 i c g
 Limnephilus hageni Banks, 1930 i c g
 Limnephilus hamifer Flint, 1963 i c g
 Limnephilus harrimani Banks, 1900 i c g
 Limnephilus helveticus Schmid, 1965 i c g
 Limnephilus hirsutus (Pictet, 1834) i c g
 Limnephilus hovsgolicus Morse, 1999 i c g
 Limnephilus hyalinus Hagen, 1861 i c g
 Limnephilus hyperboreus Thomson, 1891 i c g
 Limnephilus ignavus McLachlan, 1865 i c g
 Limnephilus incertus Martynov, 1909 i c g
 Limnephilus indivisus Walker, 1852 i c g b
 Limnephilus infernalis (Banks, 1914) i c g
 Limnephilus internalis (Banks, 1914) i c g
 Limnephilus iranus (Martynov, 1928) i c g
 Limnephilus italicus McLachlan, 1884 i c g
 Limnephilus janus Ross, 1938 i c g
 Limnephilus kalama Denning, 1968 i c g
 Limnephilus kaumarajiva Schmid, 1961 i c g
 Limnephilus kedrovayaensis Nimmo, 1995 i c g
 Limnephilus kennicotti Banks, 1920 i c g
 Limnephilus labus Ross, 1941 i c g
 Limnephilus lakshaman Olah, 1994 i c g
 Limnephilus lithus (Milne, 1935) i c g
 Limnephilus lopho Ross, 1949 i c g
 Limnephilus lucensis Navas, 1924 i c g
 Limnephilus lunatus Curtis, 1834 i c g
 Limnephilus luridus Curtis, 1834 i c g
 Limnephilus major (Martynov, 1909) i c g
 Limnephilus malickyi Sipahiler, 1992 i c g
 Limnephilus marmoratus Curtis, 1834 i c g
 Limnephilus martynovi Kumanski, 1994 i c g
 Limnephilus maya Flint, 1967 i c g
 Limnephilus mexicanus Flint, 1967 i c g
 Limnephilus microdentatus Martynov, 1913 i c g
 Limnephilus minos Malicky, 1971 i c g
 Limnephilus moestus Banks, 1908 i c g
 Limnephilus morrisoni Banks, 1920 i c g b
 Limnephilus nigriceps (Zetterstedt, 1840) i c g
 Limnephilus nimmoi Roy & Harper, 1975 i c g
 Limnephilus nipponicus Schmid, 1964 i c g
 Limnephilus nogus Ross, 1944 i c g b
 Limnephilus nybomi Malicky, 1984 i c g
 Limnephilus obsoletus Rambur, 1842 i c g
 Limnephilus occidentalis Banks, 1908 i c g b
 Limnephilus orientalis Martynov, 1935 i c g
 Limnephilus ornatulus Schmid, 1965 i c g
 Limnephilus ornatus Banks, 1897 i c g b
 Limnephilus pallens (Banks, 1920) i c g
 Limnephilus pantodapus McLachlan, 1875 i c g
 Limnephilus partitus Walker, 1852 i c g
 Limnephilus parvulus (Banks, 1905) i c g b
 Limnephilus pati O'Connor, 1980 i c g
 Limnephilus peculiaris McLachlan, 1875 i c g
 Limnephilus peltus Denning, 1962 i c g
 Limnephilus perjurus Hagen, 1861 i c g
 Limnephilus perpusillus Walker, 1852 i c g
 Limnephilus petri Marinkovic-Gospodnetic, 1966 i c g
 Limnephilus picturatus McLachlan, 1875 i c g
 Limnephilus plaga Walker, 1852 i c g
 Limnephilus politus McLachlan, 1865 i c g
 Limnephilus pollux Flint, 1967 i c g
 Limnephilus ponticus McLachlan, 1898 i c g
 Limnephilus primoryensis Nimmo, 1995 i c g
 Limnephilus productus Banks, 1914 i c g
 Limnephilus quadratus Martynov, 1914 i c g
 Limnephilus rhea Ruiter, 1995 i c g
 Limnephilus rhombicus (Linnaeus, 1758) i c g b
 Limnephilus rohweri Banks, 1908 i c g
 Limnephilus rothi Denning, 1966 i c g
 Limnephilus sackeni Banks, 1930 i c g
 Limnephilus samoedus (McLachlan, 1880) i c g
 Limnephilus sansoni Banks, 1918 i c g
 Limnephilus santanus Ross, 1949 i c g
 Limnephilus secludens Banks, 1914 i c g
 Limnephilus sericeus (Say, 1824) i c g b
 Limnephilus sibiricus Martynov, 1929 i c g
 Limnephilus sibiricusoccidentis Spuris, 1988 i c g
 Limnephilus sierrata Denning, 1968 i c g
 Limnephilus signifer Martynov, 1909 i c g
 Limnephilus sitchensis (Kolenati, 1859) i c g
 Limnephilus solidus (Hagen, 1861) i c g
 Limnephilus soporatus Scudder, 1890 i c g
 Limnephilus sparsus Curtis, 1834 i c g
 Limnephilus sperryi (Banks, 1914) i c g
 Limnephilus spinatus Banks, 1914 i c g b
 Limnephilus stigma Curtis, 1834 i c g
 Limnephilus subcentralis Brauer, 1857 i c g
 Limnephilus sublunatus Provancher, 1877 i c g
 Limnephilus submonilifer Walker, 1852 i c g b
 Limnephilus subniditus McLachlan, 1875 i c g
 Limnephilus subnitidus McLachlan, 1875 g
 Limnephilus sylviae Denning, 1949 i c g
 Limnephilus taloga Ross, 1938 i c g
 Limnephilus tarsalis (Banks, 1920) i c g
 Limnephilus tauricus Schmid, 1964 i c g
 Limnephilus thorus Ross, 1938 i c g
 Limnephilus tibeticus Schmid, 1966 i c g
 Limnephilus tiunovae Arefina & Levanidova in Arefina, Ivanov, & Levanidova, 1996 i c g
 Limnephilus transcaucasicus Martynov, 1909 i c g
 Limnephilus tricalcaratus (Mosely, 1936) i c g
 Limnephilus tulatus Denning, 1962 i c g
 Limnephilus turanus (Martynov, 1928) i c g
 Limnephilus uintah Nimmo, 1991 i c g
 Limnephilus vallei Malicky, 2004 g
 Limnephilus vittatus (Fabricius, 1798) i c g
 Limnephilus wittmeri Malicky, 1972 i c g
 Limnephilus xanthodes McLachlan, 1873 i c g
 Limnephilus znojkoi Martynov, 1938 i c g

Data sources: i = ITIS, c = Catalogue of Life, g = GBIF, b = Bugguide.net

References

Limnephilus